Spotted frog may also refer to:

 Columbia spotted frog, a frog found in North America
 Oregon spotted frog, a frog endemic to the Pacific Northwest
 Spotted chorus frog, a frog native to the United States and Mexico
 Spotted grass frog, a frog native to Australia
 Spotted paa frog, a frog endemic to Yunnan, China
 Spotted rubber frog, a frog found in several countries of Africa
 Spotted stream frog (disambiguation)
 Pulchrana picturata, a frog that is endemic to Southeast Asia
 Hylarana signata, a frog that is endemic to Southeast Asia
 Western spotted frog, a frog endemic to Western Australia

Animal common name disambiguation pages